The Flying Fish is an 8-episode Singaporean television drama series produced by Singapore Broadcasting Corporation in 1983. It revolves around the travails of an aspiring teenage swimmer and is considered one of the first locally produced "idol dramas".

Cast
Wang Yuqing as Wang Shuqi. A 17-year-old whose interest lies not in studying and preparing for University, but in swimming. This passion comes much to the chagrin of his father, who strongly believes that if Shuqi does not enter a university, it would bring immense shame to him and the family.
Chen Bifeng as Wang's sister.
Chen Weifen
Huang Xiang Qing
Ang Peng Bee as Chen Shuyu
Maggie Teng as Chen Baoer
Zeng Huifen as Ah Fen

Episodes

Reception 
A survey by Frank Small and Associates Marketing and Research Consultants estimated over 600,000 watched the series.

See also
The Champion, a 2004 MediaCorp TV series that revolved around two professional swimming teams.
No Limits, a 2010 Mediacorp TV series that revolved around two swimming sisters who were born by the same mother and different fathers, one being Flying Fish's daughter.

References

External links
 VOD page on XinMSN
 List of Flying Fish episodes

Singapore Chinese dramas
1983 Singaporean television series debuts
1983 Singaporean television series endings
1980s Singaporean television series
Channel 8 (Singapore) original programming